Glenea bakeriana is a species of beetle in the family Cerambycidae. It was described by Stephan von Breuning in 1958. It is known from Borneo.

Taxonomy
The Latin specific epithet Bakeriana is in honor of the American entomologist and botanist Charles Fuller Baker.

References

bakeriana
Beetles described in 1958